Donald Edward DeGrood (born February 14, 1965) is an American prelate of the Roman Catholic Church who has been serving as bishop of the Diocese of Sioux Falls in South Dakota since 2019.

Biography

Early life 
Donald DeGrood was born on February 14, 1965, and is the fourth of five sons of Robert and Joanne DeGrood. He grew up in Faribault, Minnesota, on his family's farm. He attended Bethlehem Academy in Faribault and the University of Saint Thomas. DeGrood then went to  Saint John Vianney College Seminary in Saint Paul from 1983 to 1987.  He worked in business for the next six years before entering The Saint Paul Seminary in Saint Paul in 1993.  DeGrood graduated from Saint Paul in 1997.

Priesthood 
DeGrood was ordained a priest for the Archdiocese of Saint Paul and Minneapolis on May 31, 1997, by Archbishop Harry Flynn. He served as associate pastor at All Saints in Lakeville, Minnesota, from 1997 to 2000, and spiritual director at Saint John Vianney College Seminary from 2000 to 2004. He was the pastor of St. Peter in Forest Lake, Minnesota, from 2004 to 2013.

In 2013, DeGrood became pastor of Blessed Sacrament in St. Paul Parish, serving there until 2015. A parishioner who had been sexually abused by a priest in that parish later said that DeGrood was "pivotal" in his healing process.  While serving at Blessed Sacrament, he also worked as vicar for clergy for the archdiocese, continuing in that role until 2017. From July 2017 until he was appointed as bishop, DeGrood was the pastor of Saint John the Baptist Parish in Savage, Minnesota.

Bishop of Sioux Falls 
On December 12, 2019, DeGrood was named the bishop of the Diocese of Sioux Falls by Pope Francis. Because the quinquennial visit ad limina visits of the United States bishops were ongoing during this period, he was able to visit and meet with Pope Francis in between his appointment and consecration on January 13, 2020. DeGrood was consecrated as a bishop and installed on February 13, 2020, by Archbishop Bernard Hebda, with Bishop Paul J. Swain and Bishop Andrew H. Cozzens as co-consecrators, at the Cathedral of Saint Joseph in Sioux Falls. DeGrood's crosier was carved by one of his brothers from a tree on their family farm.

See also

 Catholic Church hierarchy
 Catholic Church in the United States
 Historical list of the Catholic bishops of the United States
 List of Catholic bishops of the United States
 Lists of patriarchs, archbishops, and bishops

References

External links
Roman Catholic Diocese of Sioux Falls Official Site

Episcopal succession

Living people
1965 births
Roman Catholic Archdiocese of Saint Paul and Minneapolis
Catholics from Minnesota
Religious leaders from Minnesota
People from Faribault, Minnesota
21st-century Roman Catholic bishops in the United States
Bishops appointed by Pope Francis